North Fork Swan River is a tributary of the Swan River in Summit County, Colorado. The stream flows southwest from a source on Glacier Peak in the Arapaho National Forest to a confluence with the Swan River.

See also
List of rivers of Colorado

References

Rivers of Colorado
Rivers of Summit County, Colorado
Tributaries of the Colorado River in Colorado